Transformers/Ghostbusters is an American limited comic book series published in 2019 by IDW Publishing. The series serves as a crossover event between Hasbro's Transformers and Sony Pictures/Columbia Pictures' Ghostbusters, celebrating the 35th anniversary of both franchises.

Plot 
Cybertron is invaded by Gozer the Traveler, who unleashed a giant beast based on Starscream's imagination, leading the planet to its destruction. In present day, on Earth, in New York City, the Ghostbusters meet Ectronymous Diamatron, an Autobot who tracked a Cybertronian signal on Earth, one that is trapped in the ghost trap. During a small confrontation between Ectronymous and the Ghostbusters, the ghost trap is turned off, freeing Starscream's ghost, revealing it was the same signal that Ectronymous detected. Starscream reveals that during Cybertron's destruction, Megatron made a deal with an alien ghost named Kremzeek, turning Megatron into a ghost, as well as Starscream, Soundwave and Shockwave. At the Ghostbusters' firehouse headquarters, Ectronymous accepts the nicknamed "Ectotron", while Starscream is put inside the ghost trap once again. Meanwhile, Optimus Prime is trying to stay hidden while searching for Ectotron. After dealing with a blackout on Brooklyn, Ectotron reunites with Optimus, only for the Ghostbusters to find out Starscream escaped from the ghost trap. Ectotron is possessed by Starscream, while Kremzeek arrives at Earth, leading Optimus Prime and the Ghostbusters to have a tough battle. At the end of the battle, the Autobots and Ghostbusters succeed as Ectotron is freed from Starscream's possession and Kreemzeek is eaten by an Earthling ghost the heroes have summoned. However, the ghosts of Megatron, Soundwave and Shockwave appear. Both the Autobots and Ghostbusters trap the Decepticon ghosts into new traps, while Starscream escapes, vowing to return one day. Optimus and Ectotron accept to stay with the Ghostbusters. Starscream intercepts the Autobot spaceship, where the remaining Autobots are inside.

Publication history

Comic book 
The Transformers/Ghostbusters series is written by Erik Burnham, illustrated by Dan Schoening and colored by Luis Antonio Delgado. The series serves to celebrate the 35th anniversary of Hasbro's Transformers and Columbia Pictures' Ghostbusters.

IDW Publishing's editor-in-chief John Barber said “1984 was a seismic shift for entertainment, the year that launched both Transformers and Ghostbusters. Back then, Little John Barber was right there for Transformers and a little scared of Ghostbusters—but now, I'm a bit braver and can't wait to see the two worlds collide.”

During an interview with Syfy Wire, IDW's editor Tom Waltz said "We’ve been calling Transformers/Ghostbusters (the "Ghosts of Cybertron" storyline) "The Crossover Event 35 Years in the Making," but once we got started, we quickly realized it's the crossover that was ALWAYS meant to be – it's that much fun. And who better to bring it all together than the superstar creative team of Erik Burnham, Dan Schoening, and Luis Antonio Delgado, the undisputed champions of awesome ’80s mash-ups!"

Toy 
As part of the Transformers Collaborative series, Hasbro released in 2019 a toy figure based on the character Ectotron, which is also based on the Ecto-1 vehicle. They also released an exclusive recolor of the Masterpiece Mp-10 Optimus Prime toy with a Ghostbusters-themed color scheme and accessory sets.

Characters

Issues

Reception

Collected editions

References

External links 
 IDW Publishing's official announcement

Ghostbusters
Ghostbusters comics
Crossover comics
IDW Publishing titles
Comics set in New York City